The 12th Infantry Division (12-ya Pekhotnaya Diviziya) was an infantry formation of the Russian Imperial Army that existed in various formations from the early 19th century until the end of World War I and the Russian Revolution. The division was based in Lutsk in the years leading up to 1914. It fought in World War I and was demobilized in 1918.

Organization 
The 12th Infantry Division was part of the 12th Army Corps.
1st Brigade (HQ Proskurov)
45th Azov Infantry Regiment 
46th Dnieper Infantry Regiment
2nd Brigade (HQ Kamenets-Podolsk)
47th Ukrainian Infantry Regiment
48th Odessa Infantry Regiment
12th Artillery Brigade

Commanders
1868–1871: Pyotr Vannovskiy
08/31/1871 - хх.хх.1878 - Lieutenant General Baron von Firks, Alexander Alexandrovich
хх.хх.1878 - 03.20, 1880 - Major General Nielson, Andrey Andreevich
03.20.1880 - 06.24, 1886 - major general (from 30.08.1881 lieutenant general) Oranovsky, Aloysiy Kazimirovich
1886–1892: Dmitrij Petrovich Dohturov
10/02, 1892 - January 20, 1895 - major general (from 30 August 1893 lieutenant general) Gervais, Vladimir Konstantinovich
January 26, 1895 - until July 28, 1895 - Major General Troitsky, Pyotr Arkhipovich
08/14/1895 - 08/11, 1900 - major general (from December 6, 1895, lieutenant general) Karass, Ivan Alexandrovich
08/31/1900 - 04/28, 1901 - major general (from 01/01/1901 lieutenant general) Avinov, Nikolai Alexandrovich)
05/20/1901 - 02/12, 1903 - Lieutenant General Tchaikovsky, Andrei Petrovich
03/29/1903 - 06/18, 1905 - Lieutenant General Fursov, Dmitry Semenovich
10/09/1905 - 05/23, 1906 - Lieutenant General Tugan-Mirza-Baranovsky, Alexander Davydovich
05/29/1906 - 09/22, 1910 - Lieutenant General Rusanov, Sergey Ivanovich
09/22/1910 - 10/02, 1914 - Lieutenant General Orlov, Nikolai Alexandrovich
10/02/1914 - 07/31, 1915 - major general (since 1915 lieutenant general) Babikov, Nikolai Alexandrovich
1915-1916: Mikhail Hanzhin

Chiefs of Staff
January 1, 1857 - 02/08, 1857 - Colonel Fok, Nikolai Alexandrovich
02/08, 1857 - after March 3, 1864 - lieutenant colonel (Colonel from August 30, 1860) Batesatul, Alexander Mikhailovich
August 24, 1864 - 03.10, 1869 - lieutenant colonel (Colonel from April 16, 1867) Poznansky, Ignatiy Nikolaevich
11/12, 1869 - 10/08, 1875 - lieutenant colonel (colonel from April 17, 1870) Buddha, Victor Emmanuilovich
August 16, 1875 - 03/12, 1877 - Colonel Kirilov, Alexey Alexandrovich
03/12, 1877 - March 30, 1878 - Colonel Brant, Fedor Fedorovich
хх.хх, 1878 - хх.хх, 1882 - Colonel Sumerov, Vladimir Artemievich
April 29, 1882 - 06/04, 1883 - Colonel Akkerman, Nikolai Yulievich
06/04, 1883 - November 30, 1891 - Colonel Maksimovich, Mikhail Leontyevich
12/05, 1891 - June 21, 1894 - and. Colonel Fedorov, Mikhail Fedorovich
June 25, 1894 - January 20, 1895 - Colonel Orlov, Vladimir Alexandrovich
01/20, 1895 - October 31, 1899 - Colonel Yurgens, Konstantin Danilovich
12/04, 1899 - 08/02, 1902 - Colonel Popov, Ippolit Ivanovich
11/4, 1902 - March 22, 1904 - lieutenant colonel (colonel from 12/06, 1903) Bogatko, Nikolay Iosifovich
04/07, 1905 - October 29, 1909 - lieutenant colonel (colonel from 12/06, 1907) Arkhipovich, Nikolay Georgievich
October 29, 1909 - 11/07, 1911 - Colonel Prikhodkin, Dmitry Dmitrievich
November 16, 1911 - February 2, 1915 - Colonel Vladimir Nikolaevich Shokorov 
January 28, 1916 - 03/01, 1917 - Major General Andrei Snesarev

Commanders of the 1st Brigade
хх.хх.хххх — 06.02.1875 — Major General Budogossky, Konstantin Faddeevich
19.03.1875 — хх.хх.1879 — Major General Tsitlidzev, George Pavlovich
13.07.1879 — 15.10.1885 — Major General Buddha, Victor Emmanuilovich
15.10.1885 — хх.хх.1886 — Major General Fofanov, Timofey Alexandrovich
07.04.1886 — 05.04.1890 — Major General Degen, Modest Nikolaevich
04.07.1890 — 13.09.1895 — Major General Kotsebu, Pavel Augustovich
13.09.1895 — 16.07.1901 — Major General von Schulz, Eduard Eduardovich
16.07.1901 — 30.09.1904 — Major General Znosko-Borovsky, Nikolai Alexandrovich
30.09.1904 — 06.07.1909 — Major General Chizh, Alexander Stepanovich
31.07.1909 — 08.05.1914 — Major General Vladimir Alekseyevich Alftan
11.06.1914 — 01.05.1915 — Major General Troitsky, Mikhail Ivanovich

Commanders of the 2nd Brigade
August 30, 1873 - October 15, 1885 - Major General Fofanov, Timofey Alexandrovich
October 15, 1885 - February 19, 1890 - Major General Buddha, Victor Emmanuilovich
February 19, 1890 - February 7, 1894 - Major General Prokope, German Berndtovich
February 26, 1894 - October 11, 1899 - Major General Ockerman, Wilhelm Khristianovich
October 24, 1899 - June 26, 1906 - Major General Perebaskin, Victor Alexandrovich
August 28, 1906 - February 7, 1909 - Major General Voeykov, Pyotr Pavlovich
February 17, 1909 - October 12, 1911 - Major General Anatoly Rosenshield
November 22, 1911 - 07/05, 1915 - Major General Pavlov, Dmitry Petrovich
08/03, 1915 - 06/07, 1916 - Major General Parkhomov, Dmitry Nikolaevich

Commanders of the Artillery Brigade
September 25, 1807 - February 14, 1811 - Colonel Vasilyev, Alexander Mikhailovich
February 14, 1811 - 12/10/1813 - lieutenant colonel (colonel from 06/13/1811) Kolotinsky, Mikhail Mikhailovich
10/12, 1813 - 08/10, 1814 - Lieutenant Colonel Bikbulatov, Nikolai Mikhailovich
05/02, 1816 - December 17, 1817 - Colonel Bendersky, Konstantin Alexandrovich
January 18, 1818 - 03/07, 1818 - Colonel Levashov
03/07, 1818 - 05/02, 1825 - Colonel Timan, Alexander Ivanovich
05/02, 1825 - July 31, 1828 - Colonel Ladyzhensky, Vasily Maximovich
July 31, 1828 - 06/09, 1837 - lieutenant colonel (colonel from 08/20/1828, major general from 12/06/1836) Serputovsky, Adam Osipovich
10/03, 1837 - after February 2, 1846 - lieutenant colonel (colonel from 09/09/1838) Berezin, Egor Afanasevich
1847 - 12/06, 1848 - Colonel Gramotin, Alexei Petrovich
1869 - after 08/01, 1872 - Colonel (from April 17, 1870, Major General) Borozdin, Mikhail Fedorovich
xx.xx.187x - March 19, 1877 - Major General Kalmykov, Vasily Alexandrovich
March 25, 1877 - October 13, 1878 - Colonel (with Major General Grigoryev, Dmitry Petrovich
July 29, 1879 - June 25, 1884 - Colonel (from August 30, 1880, Major General) Skerletov, Nikolai Pavlovich
February 27, 1887 - April 24, 1895 - Major General Maximov, Alexander Alexandrovich
May 3, 1895 - September 23, 1900 - Major General Kartamyshev, Arkady Ivanovich
November 4, 1900 - June 27, 1906 - Colonel (major general since 12/06, 1901) Not, Pyotr Petrovich
June 27, 1906 - November 4, 1906 - Colonel Kurakin, Nikolai Ivanovich
November 4, 1906 - July 20, 1911 - Major General Konradi, Vladimir Georgievich
July 22, 1911 - April 15, 1915 - Major General Kolpakov, Sergey Nikolaevich

References 

Infantry divisions of the Russian Empire
Military units and formations disestablished in 1918
Podolia Governorate